Borislav "Boro" Kuzmanović (born 2 December 1962) is a Croatian football coach and a former midfielder. He is an assistant coach of St. Gallen in Switzerland.

Playing career

Club
Kuzmanović began his footballing career in his native Croatia with Slavonski Brod and Dinamo Zagreb before continuing his footballing career in Switzerland and the Netherlands.

Managerial career
After his footballing career, Kuzmanović moved into management in the Netherlands. He was a long time manager for Winterthur from 2009 to 2014, before working as an assistant with Grasshopper. He was briefly an interim manager in the Swiss Super League managing Grasshopper and St. Gallen.

Personal life
Kuzmanović is the father of the footballer Kristian Kuzmanović.

References

External links

1989 births
Living people
Sportspeople from Slavonski Brod
Association football midfielders
Yugoslav footballers
Croatian footballers
NK Marsonia players
GNK Dinamo Zagreb players
ADO Den Haag players
Hermes DVS players
FC Schaffhausen players
Yugoslav First League players
Eredivisie players
Swiss Super League players
Yugoslav expatriate footballers
Expatriate footballers in the Netherlands
Yugoslav expatriate sportspeople in the Netherlands
Croatian expatriate footballers
Expatriate footballers in Switzerland
Croatian expatriate sportspeople in Switzerland
Croatian football managers
FC Schaffhausen managers
FC Winterthur managers
FC St. Gallen managers
Croatian expatriate football managers
Expatriate football managers in Switzerland